Fiumicello is a frazione of Fiumicello Villa Vicentina in the Province of Udine in the Italian region Friuli-Venezia Giulia, located about  northwest of Trieste and about  southeast of Udine.

Fiumicello borders the following municipalities: Aquileia, Grado, Ruda, San Canzian d'Isonzo, Turriaco, Villa Vicentina.

Demographic evolution

Twin towns
 Le Temple-sur-Lot, France

Climate
Climate is characterized by relatively high temperatures and evenly distributed precipitation throughout the year.  Temperatures are high and can lead to warm, oppressive nights. Summers are usually somewhat wetter than winters, with much of the rainfall coming from convectional thunderstorm activity.  The Köppen Climate Classification subtype for this climate is "Cfa" (Humid Subtropical Climate).

Notable People
Pietro Blaserna (1836–1918), mathematician and physicist
Giulio Regeni (1988–2016), student torture murdered by Egyptian police

References

External links
 www.comune.fiumicello.ud.it

Cities and towns in Friuli-Venezia Giulia